Faxonius peruncus, the Big Creek crayfish, is a species of crayfish in the family Cambaridae. It is endemic to Missouri.  The common name refers to Big Creek, where the original specimens were found.

Distribution
F. peruncus is limited to the St. Francis River watershed.

Threats
The main threat to this species is a related species, F. hylas which was introduced into the area in 1984. F. hylas out-competes, and hybridises with, F. peruncus. Also, pollution from the Southeast Missouri Lead District affects the water quality in the local area.

References

External links

Cambaridae
Fauna of the United States
Endemic fauna of Missouri
Freshwater crustaceans of North America
Crustaceans described in 1931
Taxobox binomials not recognized by IUCN